Joseph A. Graf Jr. (born July 12, 1998) is an American professional stock car racing driver. He competes full-time in the NASCAR Xfinity Series, driving the No. 38/39 Ford Mustang for RSS Racing and the No. 19 Toyota Supra for Joe Gibbs Racing.

Racing career

At the beginning of his career, Graf drove Bandolero cars at Elko Speedway. He later raced Modifieds at Stafford Speedway.

ARCA Menards Series

Graf ran the whole season in 2018 save for the season-opening race at Daytona. The deal originally started out as a six-race schedule, but eventually expanded to 19 races. In his third race at Talladega, Graf raced on a foot he had recently broken and finished second to Zane Smith in the closest finish in series history. At Berlin Raceway in August, Graf spun Chandler Smith on the would-be final lap and then, after losing the lead to Zane Smith on the ensuing restart, pushed Smith up the track in turn four on the final lap to claim his first checkered flag in ARCA competition.

Xfinity Series
In April 2019, Graf joined Richard Childress Racing's driver development program, which enabled him to run five NASCAR Xfinity Series races for the team starting with Michigan International Speedway's LTi Printing 250. He also became a marketing and communications intern for the team. After failing to qualify at Michigan, he made his series debut in Iowa Speedway's CircuitCity.com 250, where he finished 19th. Graf later said that he hopes to use the schedule as a lead-up to a full-time Xfinity schedule in 2020. At Richmond Raceway in September, Graf blew the tire of John Hunter Nemechek when Graf moved Nemechek, a driver competing in the NASCAR playoffs, on the last lap. In retaliation, Nemechek spun Graf's car, in turn, one after the checkered flag.

On January 16, 2020, SS-Green Light Racing announced Graf would race for the team full-time in the Xfinity Series that year, replacing Gray Gaulding in the team's No. 08 car. He finished 22nd in points with a best finish of 13th on three occasions.

Graf moved to the team's No. 07 in 2021. Prior to the start of the season, Graf hired Buffalo Bills player Antonio Williams as an advisor; the two had befriended each other through a mutual acquaintance. At the conclusion of the Martinsville race, a fight broke out on pit road between Graf and Gray Gaulding after Gaulding wrecked Graf on lap 177. He missed the Pit Boss 250 at Circuit of the Americas due to a strained left knee and was replaced by Ross Chastain; Graf had run the weekend's practice but ranked 40th due to the injury affecting his braking ability.

In 2022, Graf would return to SS-Green Light Racing in the No. 07 and the No. 08. After failing to qualify the No. 08 in the Production Alliance Group 300, he replaced Timmy Hill in RSS Racing's No. 38 and finished 15th.

In 2023, Graf will run a full-time schedule with two different teams: 28 races in the No. 38 Ford Mustang for RSS Racing and five races in the No. 19 Toyota Supra for Joe Gibbs Racing.

Personal life
Raised in Mahwah, New Jersey, Graf attended Don Bosco Preparatory High School and played high school sports for two years before choosing to focus on his driving.

Graf attends New York University.

He is not related to Klaus Graf who is also a racing driver.

Motorsports career results

NASCAR
(key) (Bold – Pole position awarded by qualifying time. Italics – Pole position earned by points standings or practice time. * – Most laps led.)

Xfinity Series

ARCA Menards Series
(key) (Bold – Pole position awarded by qualifying time. Italics – Pole position earned by points standings or practice time. * – Most laps led.)

ARCA Menards Series East

 Season still in progress

References

External links

 
 

1998 births
Living people
ARCA Menards Series drivers
Don Bosco Preparatory High School alumni
New York University alumni
Racing drivers from New Jersey
People from Mahwah, New Jersey
Sportspeople from Bergen County, New Jersey
NASCAR drivers
Richard Childress Racing drivers